The Panther Bride (German: Die Pantherbraut) is a 1919 German silent crime film directed by Léo Lasko and starring Carl Auen, Victor Janson and Ria Jende. It was part of a series of films featuring the detective character Joe Deebs.

It was shot at the Tempelhof Studios in Berlin. The film's sets were designed by the art director Kurt Richter.

Cast
 Carl Auen as Joe Deebs, Detektiv 
 Victor Janson as Ferry Douglas 
 Ria Jende as Ellen 
 Bernhard Goetzke as Priester 
 Martin Hartwig as Fakir 
 Adolf Klein as Direktor Eric Hansen 
 Albert Patry as Oberpriester der Kali 
 Emil Rameau as Dr. Duffoir

References

Bibliography
Ken Wlaschin. Silent Mystery and Detective Movies: A Comprehensive Filmography. McFarland, 2009.
 Hans-Michael Bock & Michael Töteberg. Das Ufa-Buch. Zweitausendeins, 1992.

External links

1919 films
Films of the Weimar Republic
German silent feature films
Films directed by Léo Lasko
UFA GmbH films
German black-and-white films
German crime films
1919 crime films
Films shot at Tempelhof Studios
1910s German films
1910s German-language films